Cheshmandegan-e Olya (also Romanized as Cheshmandegān-e ‘Olyā; also known as Cheshm Andegān and Cheshmehgān) is a village in Chenarud-e Shomali Rural District, Chenarud District, Chadegan County, Isfahan Province, Iran. At the 2006 census, its population was 105, in 20 families.

References 

Populated places in Chadegan County